Hon kommer med solsken (She comes with sunshine) is a song written by Larry Forsberg, Lennart Wastesson and Sven-Inge Sjöberg.  Swedish folk music band Östen med Resten performed this song at Melodifestivalen 2002, where it finished on 10th place. It peaked at 38th place on Sverigetopplistan and the B-side consisted of a cover version of Vikingarna's  Till mitt eget Blue Hawaii. The song has also been placed on Svensktoppen, with 2nd place as the best, 6 April–3 August 2002, but failed on 10 August.

References

Melodifestivalen songs of 2002
2002 singles
Östen med Resten songs
2002 songs
Warner Music Group singles